Mazar Pass, also refer to it as Sailyak Pass() is a long mountain pass with numerous hairpin turns along China National Highway 219 (G219), the highway connecting Xinjiang and Tibet. The mountain pass crosses the Kunlun Mountains. It is between the villages of Kudi and Mazar in Kargilik County in southwestern Xinjiang. Western sources often refer to it as Chiragsaldi Pass.

The highway was first completed in 1957, and fully asphalted in 2013. 

The small village to the south Mazar was so named because it was the site of two Uyghur mazars. The village contains a Chinese army service station. In recent decades, it also serves as a truck stop for the G219 highway and stop for expeditions en route to K2.

Chiragsaldi Pass was the name used by British explorers during the late 1800s, likewise, Mazar village which at the time was only a caravan campsite was referred to as Chiragsaldi. This name means "the lamp brew out" referencing the windiness of the campsite. French army map from early 1900s showed Chiragsaldi Pass (Tchirak-Soldi) and Sailyak Pass (Sarrakh) were different mountain passes, one going west and other going east from the same valley.

References

Mountain passes of China
Mountain passes of Xinjiang
Kunlun Mountains